Sarah Elisabeth Goode (1855 – April 8, 1905) was an American entrepreneur and inventor. She was the second known African-American woman to receive a United States patent, which she received in 1885.

Biography
 
Born in 1855 in Toledo, Ohio to Oliver and Harriet Jacobs, Goode was originally named as Sarah Elisabeth Jacobs. Little is known about Goode’s early life but it is believe that in 1870, Goode’s family moved to Chicago, Illinois where she married Archibald Goode and had children with him. Archibald considered himself as a stair builder and an upholster and he and Sarah opened a furniture store.

Invention of folding bed

Most customers of Goode's furniture store were working-class people that lived in small apartments that couldn’t fit a lot of furniture, including beds. As well as this, at the time of her invention, New York City passed a law that restricted buildings to be under 80 feet. Tenement buildings were also restricted to footprints of 25 feet by 100 feet. As Goode heard this problem from her customers in Chicago, she set out to help Chicago apartment dwellers with limited space in their apartments. Goode invented a folding bed that would become the precursor to the Murphy Bed - a hide-away bed. It was a cabinet bed which folded into a roll-top desk which had compartments for writing supplies and stationery. Her goal for the innovation was to balance the weight of the folding of the bed so it could be easily lifted up and held in its place and also provided supplementary support to the center of the bed when it was unfolded. In 1885, for her invention of the folding bed, Goode received a patent as the first African American in the United States. The patent was for a folding bed that would go on to become the modern-day murphy bed.

Legacy

Sarah Elisabeth Goode died in Chicago on April 18, 1905. In 2012, the Sarah E. Goods STEM Academy, a science and math based school! was opened in south Chicago to honor her contributions to the world. The school emphasizes on science, technology, engineering, and math (STEM) to help prepare students in their future careers. It is part of the Chicago Public Schools Urban Model High School (UMHS)

Sarah E. Goode STEM Academy is also a P-TECH school which stands for Pathways in Technology Early College High School. Not only does P-TECH connect high school students to employment opportunities in promising fields, it also offers them the chance to take college courses while in high school and to earn credits toward both—a concept called dual enrollment.

References

19th-century American inventors
1855 births
1905 deaths
African-American inventors
Women inventors
People from Toledo, Ohio
Businesspeople from Chicago
20th-century African-American women
20th-century African-American people
19th-century African-American women
19th-century American businesswomen
19th-century American businesspeople
African-American women in business
19th-century American merchants